Mimeresia semirufa, the eresine harlequin, is a butterfly in the family Lycaenidae. It is found in Ivory Coast and Ghana. The habitat consists of wetter forests.

References

Butterflies described in 1902
Poritiinae